Gandalf is a fictional wizard in J. R. R. Tolkien's book The Lord of the Rings.

Gandalf may also refer to:

In business and technology
 Gandalf Airlines, an airline company
 Gandalf Technologies, a modem and PACX manufacturer
 Gandalf, a chess engine, named after the Tolkien character

In music
 Gandalf (Finnish band), an early 1990s metal group
 Gandalf (musician), Austrian New Age musician
 Gandalf (American band), formerly Rahgoos, an influential late 1960s psychedelic rock group

In Norse mythology and folklore
 Gandalf (mythology), a dwarf in Norse mythology
 Gandalf Alfgeirsson, the legendary king of Vingulmark

In popular culture
 Gandalf the Mad, a Viking king in the Thorgal comic series
 Gandalf, used to describe lead character Saito, a character in the anime The Familiar of Zero

Other
 GANDALF trial, the 1997 UK trial of the editors of Green Anarchist magazine

See also
Gandolf
Gundulf

simple:Middle-earth characters#Gandalf